Asura aureata is a moth of the  family Erebidae. It is found in India.

References

aureata
Moths described in 1913
Taxa named by Walter Rothschild
Moths of Asia